The West Indies cricket team toured Zimbabwe for five One Day Internationals in November and December 2007.

ODI series

1st ODI

2nd ODI

3rd ODI

4th ODI

5th ODI

References

External links

2007 in West Indian cricket
2007 in Zimbabwean cricket
International cricket competitions in 2007–08
2007-08
Zimbabwean cricket seasons from 2000–01